The Reformed Anglican Church (formerly named the "Protestant Episcopal Church, USA") is a Reformed and episcopal church in the United States.  It was founded as a split from the tiny Traditional Protestant Episcopal Church, now defunct. The church is strongly confessional, Reformed and evangelical.
It uses the 1928 Book of Common Prayer.

The current Bishop is the Rt. Rev. Robert S. Biermann

Theology

Creeds 
Athanasian Creed
Nicene Creed
Apostles Creed

Catechisms 
Nowell's Catechism
Heidelberg Catechism
Anglican Catechism
39 Articles of Faith

Solas 
Sola Scriptura
Solus Christus
Sola Gratia
Sola Fide
Soli Deo Gloria

Congregations 
The Reformed Anglican Church currently has 5 congregations:
Good Shepard Anglican Church (Tampa, Florida)
St. Andrews Traditional Anglican Church (Middleboro, Massachusetts)
Resurrection Anglican Church (St. Augustine, Florida) 
Christ Church (Appomattox, Virginia)
Waterford Anglican Fellowship (Spring 2015) (Waterford, Maine)

References 

Christian denominations in North America
Reformed Church in America
Episcopacy in Anglicanism
Continuing Anglican denominations